Agh Veran (also Romanized as Āgh Verān; also known as Āqverān and Āq Verān) is a village in Chaldoran-e Shomali Rural District, in the Central District of Chaldoran County, West Azerbaijan Province, Iran. At the 2006 census, its population was 59, in 20 families.

References 

Populated places in Chaldoran County